Harry Boldt (born 23 February 1930) is a German equestrian and Olympic champion. He was born in Insterburg, East Prussia, Germany. He won a gold medal in the team dressage at the 1964 Summer Olympics in Tokyo, and another at the 1976 Summer Olympics in Montreal.

References

External links

1930 births
Living people
German dressage riders
Equestrians at the 1964 Summer Olympics
Equestrians at the 1976 Summer Olympics
Olympic equestrians of West Germany
German male equestrians
Olympic equestrians of the United Team of Germany
Olympic gold medalists for West Germany
Olympic medalists in equestrian
Olympic silver medalists for West Germany
Olympic gold medalists for the United Team of Germany
Olympic silver medalists for the United Team of Germany
People from East Prussia
People from Insterburg
Medalists at the 1976 Summer Olympics
Medalists at the 1964 Summer Olympics